Basque centers (in  or eusko etxeak) are associative organizations that appeared in the end of the 19th century in cities that have really an important presence of Basque emigration, with the purpose of helping each other and keeping links with Basque culture and homeland. They are also meeting points for the Basque people who live all around the world far away from their land.

Their objective is to recover documents concerning the history of Basque exile and migration by means of research, digitalization, photographs and oral testimonies. There are more than 150 Basque Centers built all around the world. Most of them are in Argentina (62 centers), near Buenos Aires. In fact, 10% of the population has a Basque origin. Juan de Garay Foundation, works hard with this community. They do genealogical research among other things.

The United States of America are in the second place of the list, having more than 30 centers, and NABO organization (The North American Basque Organizations) coordinates all of them since 1973. In 2000, in the United States, there were 57,793 Basque origin people registered: 20,868 in California, 6,637 in Idaho, 6,096 in Nevada, 2,665 in Washington and 2,627 in Oregon.

There are ten Basque centers in Spain and two in France.

Apart from the Basque centers, there also exist several organizations and associations all around the world related to the Basque Diaspora. Among the most important ones, the Center for Basque Studies research area in Reno.

History 
In the times of the European colonization of the Americas Basque institutions arose in Perú, Mexico (Colegio de San Ignacio de Loyola Vizcaínas), etc. But it was in the 19th century when they began to prepare the Basque centers that we have today. These dates also coincide with the massive emigration to America and the choice of new destinations. Most of them were travelling to Argentina and Uruguay. It is not known which was exactly the first Basque center that was created in this epoch, but it is possible to be the Basque Center of Havana, the capital city of Cuba in 1868, even though until now it was the Basque Center of Montevideo, in 1876. The certain thing is that it was a very extended phenomenon in the whole of America.

Afterwards there was another big wave of Basque emigration with the political exile of the Spanish postwar period, what contributed to the renaissance of the Basque centers that received new emigrants who were escaping from the civil war. They thought it was going to be for a short period of time but in many cases they did not return home. Some of the countries that received the most number of exiles of the Spanish Civil war were Chile, Uruguay, Mexico and especially Argentina.

In the Basque Country, they approved in the Basque Parliament the Law by which the relations with Basque communities of the exterior were regulated. It is provided to this the legal necessary base for the Basque Government.

Objectives 
Basque centers are defined as associative entities. They are legally constituted out of the Basque Country. They have the following objectives: 
 To contribute to the strength of the Basque collectivities and Basque centers, favoring his cohesion and the efficiency of his associative actions.
 To preserve and promote the links of the Basque collectivities and Basque centers with the Basque Country. 
 To project the recognition of the reality of the Basque Country where the Basque collectivities are located, promoting activities of spreading, impulse and development of the culture and of the Basque economy.
 To benefit relations, specially social, cultural and economic relations with different countries that rely on Basque collectivities, institutions and different social agents.
 To facilitate the establishment of  communication channels between Basque residents out of the territory of the Basque Autonomous Community and the public powers of it.

The approval of the Law in the Basque Parliament, without any vote against it, supposed the beginning of a new phase of relation between the collectivities of the exterior and the public Basque institutions.

Basque Centers all over the world

Germany (2) 
 Basque German association
 Gernika: Deutsch-Baskische Kulturverein E.V, Berlin

Andorra (1) 
 Euskal Etxea d'Andorra, Santa Coloma

The United States of America (44) 
North American Basque Organization (NABO), Elko, NV
Center for Basque Studies, Reno, NV
Cenarrusa Center for Basque Studies, Boise, ID
Society of Basque Studies in America, New York, NY
Basque Educational Organization (BEO)
Basque Museum & Cultural Center, Boise, ID
Basque Associations of Boise, Boise, ID
Euzkaldunak - Boise Basque Center, Boise, ID
Txoko Ona Basque Club, Homedale, ID
Oinkari Basque Dancers, Boise, ID
Ontario Basque Club, Ontario, OR
Gauden Bat, Chino, CA
Chino Basque Club, Chino, CA
Kent County Basque Club, Bakersfield, CA
Basque Club of California, San Frantzisko, CA
San Francisco Basque Cultural Center, San Frantzisko, CA
Seattle Euskal Etxea, Seattle, WA
Euzko-Etxea of New York, New York, NY
Alkartasuna Basque Club of Southwest Wyoming, Rock Springs, WY
Elko Euskaldunak Club, Elko, NV
Zazpiak Bat Basque Club, Reno, NV
Zenbat Gara Dantzari Taldea, Reno, NV
Basque Club of Utah, Salt Lake City, UT
Colorado Euskal Etxea - The Colorado Basque Club, Arvada, CO
New Mexico Euskal Etxea
Los Angeles Oberena Basque Club, Downey, CA
Fresno Basque Club, Fresno, CA
Los Banos Basque Club, Los Banos, CA
Marin - Sonoma Basque Association, Novato, CA
Southern California Basque Club, Ontario, CA
Anaitasuna Basque Club, San Frantzisko, CA
Ventura County Basque Club, Thousand Oaks, CA
Txoko Alai - Euskal Etxea of Miami, Miami, FL
Gooding Basque Association, Boise, ID
Euskal Lagunak, Mountain Home, ID
Battle Mountain Oberenak Club, Battle Mountain, NV
Mendiko Euskaldun Cluba, Gardenville, NV
Lagun Onak Las Vegas Basque Club, Las Vegas, NV
Portland Basque Club, West Linn, OR
Washington D.C. Euskal Etxea, Alexandria, VA
Inland Northwest Euskal Etxea, Spokane, WA
Big Horn Basque Club, Buffalo, WY
Vascos en Puerto Rico, San Juan, PR

Argentina (85) 
Centro Vasco del Chaco "Kotoiaren Lurra", Resistencia
Centro Vasco Itxaropena de Saladillo, Buenos Aires
Escuela de Lengua Vasca de Buenos Aires Euskaltzaleak, Buenos Aires
Centro Vasco "Ibai Guren", Paraná
Centro Vasco Zazpirak Bat, Rosario
Centro Vasco Denak Bat de Mendoza, Mendoza
Centro Vasco "Villegas´ko Euskaldunak", Buenos Aires
Centro Laurak Bat, Buenos Aires
Centro Vasco Denak Bat Cañuelas, Buenos Aires
Colectividad Vasca de Concordia, Concordia
Centro Basko "Euzko Etxea", Buenos Aires
Centro Vasco "Toki Eder", Buenos Aires
Centro Vasco Gure Txokoa de Rauch (visita Ardanbera)
Centro Vasco Denak Bat de Temperley
Centro Vasco Euskal Etxea Villa Mercedes, Villa Mercedes
Centro Vasco Argentino Zingirako Euskaldunak, Buenos Aires
Hiru Erreka, Centro Vasco de Tres Arroyos
Asociación Unión Vasca Euzko Alkartasuna, La Pampa
Danak Bat Centro Vasco Argentino de Bolívar, Buenos Aires
Colegios 'Euskal Echea' (Lavallol eta Buenos Aires)
Iparralde Dantzari Taldea, Buenos Aires
Asociación Coral 'Lagun Onak', Buenos Aires
Coral Alkartasuna, Buenos Aires
Centro Vasco Argentino Beti Aurrera, Buenos Aires
Centro Vasco Euskal-Etxea San Nicolás, Buenos Aires
Centro Vasco "Hiru Erreka"
Federación de Entidades Vasco Argentinas - FEVA
Fundación Vasco Argentina Juan de Garay, Buenos Aires
Asociación Vasco Argentina Urrundik, Paraná
Centro Vasco de Santa Cruz Hegoalde Argentinarra, Río Gallegos
Euskaldunak Denak Bat Sociedad de Socorros Mutuos, Buenos, Aires
Centro Vasco Euskal Odola de Ayacucho, Buenos Aires
Centro Basko Azuleño "Gure Txokoa", Buenos Aires
Unión Vasca Sociedad de Socorros Mutuos, Buenos Aires
Centro Vasco Balcarce'ko Euskaldunak, Buenos Aires
Centro Vasco Argentino "Danak Anaiak", Buenos Aires
Centro Vasco Euskalduna, Buenos Aires
Centro Vasco "Guillermo Larregui", Buenos Aires
Denak Elkarrekin, Buenos Aires
Asociación Centro Vasco "Eusko Biltzar", Buenos Aires
Centro Vasco "Eusko Aterpea", Buenos Aires
Centro Vasco "Arbola Bat", Buenos Aires
Centro Vasco Argentino "Lagunen Etxea", Buenos Aires
Centro Vasco Loreta'ko Euskaldunak, Buenos Aires
Centro Vasco Denak Bat de Lomas de Zamora, Buenos Aires
Centro Vasco "Ongi Etorri", Buenos Aires
Centro Vasco Anaitasuna, Buenos Aires
Centro Vasco Denak Bat de Mar de Plata, Buenos Aires
Centro Vasco "Gure Eusko Tokia", Buenos Aires
Centro Basko Argentino "Euzko Etxea" de Necochea, Buenos Aires
Centro Basko "Etxe Alai", Buenos Aires
Centro Basko Lagun Onak, Buenos Aires
Centro Vasco "Nuestro Rincón - Gure Txokoa", Buenos Aires
Centro Vasco "Eusko - Deya" de Salliqueló, Buenos Aires
Centro Vasco de Suipacha Gure Txokoa, Buenos Aires
Centro Vasco Argentino 'Gure Etxea', Buenos Aires
Centro Basko Euskal Sustraiak, Buenos Aires
Gure Etxea - Casa de la Cultura Vasca, Buenos Aires
Acción Vasca de la Argentina, Buenos Aires
Asociación Emakume Abertzale Batza, Buenos Aires
Centro Vasco Francés, Buenos Aires
Club Vasco Argentino Gure Echea, Buenos Aires
Euskal Echea Asociación Cultural y Beneficencia, Buenos Aires
Eusko Kultur Etxea - Casa de la Cultura Vasca, Buenos Aires
Asociación Euskal Echea de Socorros Mutuos, Comodoro Rivadavia
Centro Vasco del Noreste del Chubut, Trelew
Centro Vasco Argentino "Gure Txokoa", Córdoba
Centro Vasco "Gure Ametza", Río Cuarto
Centro Vasco "Euzko-Etxea", Villa-María
Asociación Vasca Ibai Txori, Concepción de Uruguay
Centro Vasco "Denak Bat" de Jujuy, San Salvador de Jujuy
Asociación Centro Rincón Vasco "Euzko Txokoa", La Pampa
Centro Vasco "Zelaiko Euskal Etxea", La Pampa
Centro Atuel'ko Euskotarrak, Mendoza
Asociación Civil Eusko Etxea de Corpus Christi, Corpus Christi
Asociación Civil Centro Vasco Misiones, Posadas
Centro Vasco del Comahue "Zazpirak Bat", Cipolletti
Centro Vasco "Gure Etxea", Río Negro
Centro Vasco Ibaiko Euskaldunak, Río Negro
Centro Basko Mendi'ko Euzko Etxea, Río Negro
Centro Basko Beti Aurrera Aberri Etxea de Patagones y Viedma, Viedma
Centro "Eusko - Etxea" de San Juan, San Juan
Asociación de Mujeres Vascas, Rosario
Centro Vasco Argentino Gure Etxea, Santa Fe
Asociación Cultural Denak-Bat, Buenos Aires

Australia (3) 
Gure Txoko Basque Club, Sydney, NSW
The Basque Club of North Queensland - Australia, Townsville - Castletown, QLD
Basque Society - Gure Txoko, Melbourne, VIC

Brasil (2) 
Eusko Alkartasuna de Säo Paulo, São Paulo
Eusko-Brasildar Etxea, Itapevi

Dominican Republic (1) 
Casa Vasca Euskal Etxea de Sto Domingo, Santo Domingo

El Salvador (1) 
Centro Vasco de El Salvador Euskal Etxea, San Salvador

United Kingdom (3) 
Basque Society - Euskal Elkartea, Londres
Bristol Basque Cultural Society, Bristol
Cambridge University Basque Society, Cambridge
Basque Dancing Society at New Castle University, Newcastle

Spain (11) 
Bartzelonako Euskal Etxea
Euskal Etxea - Hogar Vasco de Madrid, Madril
Centro Vasco "Gure Txoko, Valladolid
Asociación Cultural "Laminiturri", Logroño
Bartzelonako Euskal Etxea
Malagako Euskal Etxea - Casa Vasca de Málaga, Málaga
Centro Vasco de Salou "Txoko Lagun Artea", Salou
Federación de Centros 'Euskal Herria', Madril
Centro Vasco Navarro Laurak Bat de Valencia, Valentzia
Asociación Cultural Euskal Etxea de Murcia, Zarandona, Murtzia
Euskal Etxea Artea, Palma, Baleareak

France (7) 
Parisko Eskual Etxea - La Maison Basque de Paris, Paris
Choeur d'Hommes Basque 'Anaiki' Gizon Abesbatza, Paris
Gernika Dantza Taldea, Paris
Lagunt eta Maita, Paue
Eskual Etxea, Bordele
Eskualdunak - Association des Basques de Montpellier et sa Region, Montpellier
Lagunt eta Maita Euskal Etxea, Paue

Italy (1) 
Associazione Culturale Euskara - Erromako Euskal Etxea, Erroma

Japan (1) 
Tokyo-ko Euskal Etxea, Tokio

Canada (2) 
Zazpiak Bat Basque Society, Vancouver
Euskaldunak, Association des Basques du Québec, Montréal

Colombia (1) 
 Fundación Centro Vasco Euskal Etxea, Bogotá

Cuba (1) 
 Asociación Vasco Navarra de Beneficencia, Habana

Mexico (3) 
Centro Vasco Euskal Etxea A.C. de México DF, Mexiko Hiria
Instituto Vasco Mexicano de Desarrollo, Mexiko Hiria
Sukalde, Asociación Civil, Mexiko Hiria
VascosMexico, Querétar

Republic of Paraguay (1) 
 Euskal Etxea Jasone, Asunción

Peru (7) 
Euskal Etxea de Lima, Lima
Asociación Civil Cultural Virgen del Juncal, Urubamba, Kuzko
Limako Arantzazu Euzko Etxea, Miraflores, Lima 15073.
Arequipa-ko Euzko Etxea - Casa Vasca de Arequipa, Arequipa.
Xauxa-ko Euzko Etxea, Casa Vasca de Jauja, Jauja, Junin.
Limako Arantzazuko Andre Mariaren Ermandadea, San Isidro,Lima
Asociación Pelotaris del Perú, La Punta, Provincia Constitucional del Callao, Lima, Perú

Switzerland (1) 
Suitzako Euskal Etxea - Baskischer Kulturverein

Chile (3) 
Eusko Etxea - Casa Vasca de Chile, Txileko Santiago
Eusko Etxea - Casa Vasca de Valparaíso, Viña del Mar, Valparaíso
Fundación Vasco Chilena para el Desarrollo, Txileko Santiago

China (1) 
Shanghaiko Euskal Etxea, Shanghai

Uruguay (9) 
Saltoko Euskaldunen Taldea, Salto
Ibai Ondoko Etxea, Carmelo, Colonia
Euskal Etxea Juan L. Lacaze, Juan L. Lacaze, Colonia
Gure Etxea Colonia, Rosario, Colonia
Euskal Etxea Durazno, Durazno
Confraternidad Vasca "Gure Baserria", Minas, Lavalleja
Centro Vasco "Euskal Erria", Montevideo
Federación de Instituciones Vascas de Uruguay - FIVU, Montevideo
Haize Hegoa, Montevideo

Venezuela (5) 

Caracasko Eusko Etxea / Centro Vasco de Caracas (Caracas)
Valenciako Eusko Etxea / Centro Vasco Venezolano de Carabobo (Valencia, Carabobo)
Eusko Etxea Barcelona - Puerto La Cruz (Lechería, Anzoategui)
Venezuelako Eusko Etxeen Federazioa / Federación de Centros Vascos de Venezuela (Valencia, Carabobo). Valenciako Eusko Etxean du egoitza.
Sukalde Venezuela, A.C. (Caracas)

See also 
 Basque diaspora
 Basque people

External links 
Euskaletxeak.net.

Basque culture